"Put a Little Umph in It" is the first single from Jagged Edge's studio album Baby Makin' Project. It features pop–R&B singer Ashanti. The song was their first single since being dropped from Columbia Records and getting signed to Island Def Jam.

Music video
The music video was shot by Norwegian director Ray Kay around the week of July 17, 2007. Jagged Edge members looked for female video dancers with acting ability (a big plus for the Soprano's-style narrative). The video premiered on 106 & Park as the New Joint of the Day on August 15, 2007. Ashanti's verse was taken out of the song, and replaced with a clip from "Whole Town Laughing."

On HOT 97 in New York City, shortly after the video was released, Jagged Edge reportedly said Ashanti was not featured in the music video due to a conflict disagreement with Irv Gotti.

Remix
There is a So So Def Remix of the track on the Japanese version of the album Baby Makin' Project.

Charts

2007 singles
Jagged Edge (American group) songs
Ashanti (singer) songs
Songs written by Jermaine Dupri
Song recordings produced by Jermaine Dupri
Music videos directed by Ray Kay
2007 songs
Songs written by Johntá Austin
Songs written by Manuel Seal